The Prophecy was a villainous alliance in the Ring of Honor wrestling promotion, led by Christopher Daniels, whose goal was to break down Ring of Honor and rebuild in their own image. Members of The Prophecy refused to follow the Code of Honor, and at times tried to prevent others from doing so as well.

Members
The members of The Prophecy were Christopher Daniels, Simply Luscious, Donovan Morgan, Xavier, Dan Maff, Mark Briscoe, Allison Danger, and B. J. Whitmer. Samoa Joe briefly worked for The Prophecy, but was never a member. Jim Cornette briefly joined The Prophecy, but was kicked out the same night for disobeying the Code of Honor.

History

Formation (2002)
Christopher Daniels competed in the main event of the debut ROH show, The Era of Honor Begins, against Low Ki and American Dragon. After losing to Low Ki, Daniels became a villain and refused to shake hands with either opponent, breaking the Code of Honor. The three competed against each other the following show in a Round Robin tournament. After defeating Dragon on the opening match, Daniels forced him to shake his hand because "the better man won". However, after losing to Low Ki in his second match, he refused to shake his hand, and said he would not wrestle Low Ki again unless the ROH Championship (which had not been created yet) was on the line. At Night of Appreciation, Daniels wrestled Donovan Morgan in a singles match. Before the match Daniels said in a backstage interview that he had a lot of respect for Morgan because they were both California wrestlers and they had both won the ECWA Super 8 Tournament, but after he lost he refused to shake Morgan's hand. He said it was not because he did not respect Morgan, but because he believed the Code of Honor was a lie. The two then formed a partnership.

At Road to the Title, The Prophecy was officially created. Daniels revealed he had seen a prophecy, where he was to lead a group of elite athletes and destroy the Code of Honor, and rebuild ROH in their image. He then announced the first official member Simply Luscious, who felt she had been mistreated by Ring of Honor since the first show. Daniels attempted to become the first ROH Champion when he competed in a sixty-minute iron man match against Low Ki, Spanky and Doug Williams at Crowning a Champion. Despite being the only wrestler to be neither pinned nor submitted, Daniels lost the title to his rival Low Ki. The Prophecy got their revenge two shows later at Unscripted. During Low Ki's title defense against Xavier, Daniels came to the ring to distract him. While Low Ki was distracted, Xavier attacked him from behind and, with the help of Daniels, beat him with a chair and a cement pole. Low Ki crawled back into the ring and was pinned by Xavier, making him the new ROH Champion. After the match, it was made clear that Xavier was the newest member of The Prophecy. Later that night, Daniels and Morgan defeated American Dragon and Mike Modest in the finals of a one night tournament to become the first ROH Tag Team Champions. Even though Daniels and Morgan won the title, any members could defend them.

At Glory by Honor, The Prophecy refused to put any of the titles on the line. The Prophecy wanted Xavier to wrestle someone who he could easily beat and, at the advice of Mark Briscoe, squared off against Jay Briscoe. Despite having lost the majority of his matches in ROH, Jay scored a major upset by beating the ROH Champion. Later, The Prophecy's hired assassin Samoa Joe (in his Ring of Honor debut) faced Low Ki in ROH's first Fight Without Honor. After losing the hard-hitting battle, Joe showed his true colors by obeying the Code of Honor and shaking Low Ki's hand. In the main event, Daniels faced Doug Williams in a grudge match from Crowning a Champion. Angry over Daniels's refusal to shake his hand after the match, Williams challenged him to a match where if he lost Daniels would have to disband The Prophecy and adhere to the Code of Honor. If Williams lost, however, he would no longer be allowed to shake and therefore continually broke the Code of Honor. After winning, Daniels mocked Williams by offering to shake his hand. Despite some tension between The Prophecy and Samoa Joe, who refused to ruin his integrity by disobeying the Code of Honor, The Prophecy continued to be successful for the remainder of the year. At Scramble Madness, rival brothers Jay and Mark Briscoe faced each other in a tag match. Jay chose Amazing Red as his partner, while Mark chose Daniels. After winning the match and becoming the newest member of The Prophecy, Daniels told Mark's parents, who were in the front row, that The Prophecy was Mark's family now.

Feud with The Group (2002–2003)
At Final Battle 2002, while Daniels and Simply Luscious were in the ring talking with Gary Michael Capetta, Steve Corino, Daniel's friend and Luscious' real life boyfriend, came out and said he was going to form a group of his own, one that was so elite it did not even need a name, and they were going to take all the belts in Ring of Honor. He then threatened to break up with Luscious because she was a member of The Prophecy, but stopped when she left them and join The Group. Samoa Joe, also tired of Daniels and The Prophecy, left to join his friend and fellow Pro Wrestling Zero1 wrestler Corino as a member of The Group. Corino said that it was only business and not to be taken personally by Christopher Daniels. Daniels responded by bringing Allison Danger, the real life sister of Steve Corino, into The Prophecy, and start a feud between the two factions, thus beginning a rare heel vs heel storyline.  

At Expect the Unexpected, Daniels and Xavier lost the tag team title to A. J. Styles and Amazing Red. Less than two weeks later, Xavier, having suffered a concussion in the tag match, defended the ROH Championship against Samoa Joe. Christopher Daniels and Allison Danger were in his corner, but Michael Shane, the newest member of The Group, came down superkicked him, and the two were cared to the back by The Group. Xavier then lost the title to Joe. He then took time off from ROH, and The Prophecy, to heal. With Xavier gone, Morgan rarely in Ring of Honor anymore, and Mark Briscoe quietly leaving The Prophecy to form a tag team with his brother, Daniels began to search out new members for The Prophecy. At The Epic Encounter, Dan Maff walked out on his partner Monsta Mack after losing to The Backseat Boyz. Later that night, Daniels wrestled Homicide, Maff's trainer, in a singles match. After the match, The Group ran down and attacked both wrestlers. Maff ran down and chased them away, seemingly to help his trainer, but ripped off his "Repeat Offenders" shirt to reveal a Prophecy shirt underneath. He then threw his old shirt on top a Homicide's unconscious face and walked away with Daniels and Danger. After the show, he was confronted by Monsta Mack, who wanted to know why he joined The Prophecy. Maff told him that he was getting nowhere in ROH by obeying the Code of Honor, but that he could rise to the top by siding with Daniels. The two wrestled one final match together at Retribution: Round Robin Challenge II. After losing, Maff and Daniels attacked Monsta Mack. In the Round Robin tournament, Daniels defeated both Amazing Red and Paul London to win the tournament. After the main event, when Samoa Joe (along with Michael Shane) defeated Doug Williams, The Prophecy ran down and attacked The Group.

At Night of the Grudges, The Prophecy and The Group squared off in their first and only match against each other. The two factions wrestled in a six-man tag match with Daniels, Maff and Morgan facing Samoa Joe, CW Anderson and Michael Shane (who was subbing for Steve Corino who pulled out the night before), where the losing faction had to disband. The Prophecy won when Maff pinned the ROH Champion Samoa Joe. Donovan Morgan left ROH, and thus The Prophecy, after the match. As a result of pinning the champion, Maff was granted a match for the ROH Championship at Wrestle Rave 2003. His father died the day before his match, and Maff would turn into a tweener as a result. However, despite his best efforts, Maff was unable to defeat Joe in the emotional match, which he dedicated to his father.

Cornette and Xavier (2003)
The Prophecy tried to get back on track at Wrath of the Racket, when manager Jim Cornette made his ROH debut and aligned himself with The Prophecy. Cornette, known as a tag team specialist, he thought The Prophecy was a great team and managed them in the match for the ROH Tag Team Championship against A.J. Styles and Amazing Red. During intermission, when Styles and Red (who already had an injured knee going into the event), The Prophecy and Cornette attacked them. Red injured his knee to such a degree that he was not able to compete that night, and A.J. Styles was left to find another partner or face The Prophecy by himself. Styles chose Dan Maff's former trainer Homicide as his partner, and the two went on to successfully retain the titles. Cornette, despite being a member of The Prophecy, shook the hands of Styles and Homicide because the better team won. He then got into a heated argument with Christopher Daniels for letting him down and losing. The Prophecy then turned on Cornette and attacked him, until Samoa Joe and Amazing Red came to his aid. After the show, Lucy, a member of Second City Saints member and the real life girlfriend of CM Punk (who had previously turned down Daniels' offer to join The Prophecy) was attacked by an unknown assailant. Punk, who was on a tour in Japan at the time, began a long search after his return to discover who her attacker was.

Xavier, making his ROH in-ring return at Bitter Friends, Stiffer Enemies, and faced the leader of The Prophecy Daniels for the number one contendership for the ROH World Championship. The two got into an argument before the match due to Xavier saying that since he was the ROH Champion when he was in The Prophecy, he was the leader, and Daniels played second-fiddle to him. Daniels won the match and the title shot, but it was left unclear if Xavier was still a member of The Prophecy. Later that night, Dan Maff faced off against his former friend Low Ki. The referee stopped the match after Low Ki legitimately knocked Maff out after kicking him in the head.

At Glory by Honor II, Xavier competed in his first match of the "Field of Honor" tournament. He came out with valet Lollipop, adding to the mystery of whether he was still a member of The Prophecy. Allison Danger came out and demanded to know why Lollipop was there, but Xavier sent her back to the locker room, confirming he was no longer a member. In the main event, Christopher Daniels wrestled Samoa Joe for the ROH World Championship. The Prophecy suffered a bit of false hope when, after a close two-count, the time keeper rung the bell thinking the match was over and Daniels had won. The referee explained it was only a two-count and the match continued, until Joe defeated Daniels.

Feud with the Second City Saints and dissolution (2003–2004)
During this time, The Prophecy began to feud with the Second City Saints over the attack on Lucy. CM Punk, seeing The Prophecy as their biggest rival (and vice versa) figured they had to be behind the attack in order to maintain their spot as the most dominant faction in Ring of Honor. Punk continuously confronted and called out the members of The Prophecy. At The Conclusion Punk confronted Dan Maff about the attack, who swore on his father's grave that The Prophecy was not behind it. The following night, Punk called out Daniels and demanded to know if The Prophecy was behind the attack. Daniels said they were not, but Punk did not believe him. Punk attacked Daniels and hit him with his own signature move, the Angel's Wings. As a result of Punk’s actions, The Prophecy became a face stable. At Final Battle 2003 Punk had enough and called out The Prophecy. They came out but were soon attacked by the Saints. As Colt Cabana tied Daniels up in the ropes, Punk wrapped a towel around Allison Danger's throat and threatened to kill her if Daniels didn't admit to the attack. B. J. Whitmer, whom Punk had knocked out in their first match and subsequently often insulted on commentary, ran out and attacked Colt Cabana  with a chair, freeing Daniels. Daniels chased Punk out of the ring and announced that The Prophecy was behind the attack, but he did not do it. Instead, The Prophecy's newest member B. J. Whitmer had been the one who attacked Lucy. Maff, who swore on his father's grave The Prophecy wasn't behind the attack, was shocked and upset by this news, but stayed in the group. Later that night, Daniels and Maff wrestled the Great Muta and Arashi in an interpromotional match between Ring of Honor and All Japan Pro Wrestling. After defeating The Prophecy, the Great Muta offered to shake Daniels' hand, who once again refused. Instead, Daniels, Maff and Allison Danger bowed in a sign of respect.

At The Battle Lines are Drawn, ROH's first show of 2004, The Prophecy and the Second City Saints' war came to a head, and the two teams faced in a six-man tag match. The two teams fought throughout the arena, causing the referee to end the match in a no contest. During the match, Dan Maff was left badly beaten by the hands of the Saints. B. J. Whitmer was also taken out, leaving only Daniels to fight of CM Punk, Colt Cabana and Ace Steel after the match. He was easily outnumbered, and the Saints Pepsi Plunged him off the top turnbuckle, through a table. Daniels missed the next several weeks due to injury.

At The Last Stand, Maff and Whitmer competed against each other in a four-corner survival match for the number one contendership for the ROH World Championship. There was already tension between the two Prophecy members due to the events of Final Battle, and this match added to their tensions. The match ended with a double pin, as both Maff and Whitmer pinned Matt Stryker and former Prophecy member Xavier at the same time. The two then both got to wrestle Samoa Joe for the ROH World Championship at the Second Anniversary Show. In the opening match of the show, CM Punk came out to the ring dressed as Christopher Daniels. He then began to brag about ending the Christopher Daniels reign in Ring of Honor, adding more fuel to the fire in the two factions’ feud. In the ROH World Championship match, Whitmer and Maff once again squared off against each other when they faced both Joe and Low Ki. Despite the tension, the two worked together in order to insure the title came back to The Prophecy. However, they were unable to get the job done, and Joe retained the title.

At At Our Best, The Prophecy faced the Second City Saints in a match for the number one contendership for the ROH Tag Team Championships. The two teams’ hatred for each other led to a double disqualification. This show was also the final show before the Rob Feinstein controversy. As a result of the show, Total Nonstop Action Wrestling pulled all their contracted wrestlers, Christopher Daniels being one of them, from all ROH shows. The Prophecy was now without a leader. The Prophecy scored two victories in their war with the Second City Saints, as B. J. Whitmer defeated Colt Cabana at Reborn: Stage 1, and Ace Steel at Reborn: Stage 2. After the Saints won the ROH Tag Team Championship at Reborn: Stage 2, Whitmer ran down to the ring and attacked CM Punk and Colt Cabana. Ace Steel emerged from the back and laid Whitmer out with a chair shot to the head, before celebrating with the Saints. At Round Robin Challenge III The Prophecy faced both the Second City Saints and the Briscoe Brothers in a round robin tournament. Whitmer and Maff beat Punk and Cabana to win not only the match, but also the ROH Tag Team Championship. Their reign was short lived, as they lost the titles to the Briscoe Brothers later that same night.

The Prophecy got another shot at the title at Generation Next when they faced the Second City Saints, who had won the title back in the final match of the round robin tournament. Despite having gotten the best of the Saints for the past three shows, The Prophecy was defeated after CM Punk Pepsi Plunged Whitmer. Later in the evening, CM Punk called out Ricky Steamboat, whom he had been feuding with. The two began to fight with Steamboat having the upper hand, until Colt Cabana ran out and the Second City Saints double teamed him. The Prophecy ran out and chased off the Saints, rescuing Steamboat.

At World Title Classic, The Prophecy and the Second City Saints fought against each other, as well as against the Briscoe Brothers and Generation Next, in ROH's first Ultimate Endurance match. The match was an elimination match, and after a team was eliminated the rules changed, essentially making it three matches in one. The first match, a submission match, ended with the elimination of Generation Next by The Prophecy. The second match, a scramble tag match, ended with the elimination of the Briscoe Brothers, again by The Prophecy. The Prophecy and the Saints then fought in a falls count anywhere match. The two teams fought all over the arena and used weapons such as chairs and tables to hurt each other. The Prophecy won after Maff gave Colt Cabana a Burning Hammer off the top rope, through a table. After the match, Dan Maff, knowing that Christopher Daniels won't return to Ring of Honor, convinced B. J. Whitmer that they should drop The Prophecy name and go out on their own. Whitmer agreed and the two walked away from The Prophecy, as well as Allison Danger. The Prophecy was now officially ended.

Aftermath
Dan Maff and B. J. Whitmer spent the next year feuding with Allison Danger, who was angry at them for leaving The Prophecy. She hired numerous wrestlers, including the Carnage Crew, to face the two in a series of hardcore matches. After Mick Foley made his ROH debut, he praise Whitmer and Maff for their hardcore work, and said that to him ROH stand for "Ring of Hardcore". Foley then feuded with Ricky Steamboat, who did not approve of hardcore wrestling. Foley chose Whitmer and Maff as his hardcore tag team, and the two faced Ricky Steamboat's pure wrestlers of Nigel McGuinness and Chad Collyer. At the Third Anniversary Celebration: Part , Maff and Whitmer defeated The Rottweilers (Ricky Reyes and Rocky Romero) to become two-time ROH Tag Team Champions. Their reign was short lived as Dan Maff was forced out of ROH a month later after having a falling out with his trainer Homicide. Whitmer then teamed with Jimmy Jacobs and once again became an ROH Tag Team Champion.

Christopher Daniels made his long-awaited ROH return at Death before Dishonor III. Allison Danger came out earlier in the show to announce that Daniels was on his way back, and that he was going to reform The Prophecy. After the main event, when CM Punk won the ROH World Championship in his final match for ROH before leaving for WWE, he turned heel and said he was going to take the title with him when he left. He then challenged anyone in the locker room to try and stop him. While Punk watched the entrance ramp expecting to see someone like Samoa Joe, Christopher Daniels (to a huge response from the audience) ran in through the crowd behind him. Daniels and Punk began to brawl while the fans chanted "Ring the Bell!" Punk ran out of the ring and out of the building, still holding the ROH title. Daniels tried for the next several shows to win the ROH title, but was unable to do so. Danger would resume her role as Daniels' manager for the rest of his ROH term.

At Hell Freezes Over in 2006, B. J. Whitmer attacked Christopher Daniels because he walked out of ROH and The Prophecy in 2004. The two fought at the Fourth Anniversary Show, but their match was ended after wrestlers from Combat Zone Wrestling took over the ring. Whitmer went on to become a member of "Team ROH" along with Samoa Joe, Adam Pearce and Ace Steel and helped fight off the CZW invasion. At The 100th, Daniels made ROH history as, for the first time ever, he respectfully shook Claudio Castagnoli's hand after their match, adhering to the "Code of Honor" (Castagnoli then betrayed ROH later that night and joined his best friend Chris Hero with CZW). Later in the year, Daniels became a two-time ROH Tag Team Champion, as he and Matt Sydal defeated The Kings of Wrestling (Hero and Castagnoli).

Championships and accomplishments
Ring of Honor
ROH World Championship (1 time) – Xavier
ROH Tag Team Championship (3 times) – Christopher Daniels and Donovan Morgan (1) and Dan Maff and B. J. Whitmer (2)
ROH Tag Team Championship Tournament (2002) – Daniels and Morgan

References

Ring of Honor teams and stables